Belgravia is a district in central London.

Belgravia may also refer to:

Places
Belgravia, Edmonton, a neighbourhood in Edmonton, Alberta, Canada.
 McKernan/Belgravia station, a rapid transit station serving this neighbourhood.
Belgravia, Gauteng, a suburb of Johannesburg, South Africa.
Briar Hill-Belgravia, a neighbourhood in Toronto, Ontario, Canada.
St. James-Belgravia Historic District, in Louisville, Kentucky, USA.
Belgravia, Harare, a suburb in Harare, Zimbabwe.

Other
Belgravia (magazine) (1866–1899), a London literary magazine
 Belgravia Building (1904) in Boise, Idaho
"Belgravia" (1968), a song by Manfred Mann from the album Up the Junction
Belgravia (2016), a novel by Julian Fellowes
Belgravia (TV series), a 2019 TV adaptation of Julian Fellowes' novel